Tubulin-specific chaperone A is a protein that in humans is encoded by the TBCA gene.

The product of this gene is one of four proteins (cofactors A, D, E, and C) involved in the pathway leading to correctly folded beta-tubulin from folding intermediates. Cofactors A and D are believed to play a role in capturing and stabilizing beta-tubulin intermediates in a quasi-native confirmation. Cofactor E binds to the cofactor D/beta-tubulin complex; interaction with cofactor C then causes the release of beta-tubulin polypeptides that are committed to the native state. This gene encodes chaperonin cofactor A.

References

Further reading